is a Japanese manga series written and illustrated by Masatoshi Kawahara. The manga was licensed and published in Taiwan by Tong Li Publishing.

Reception
The thirty-sixth volume of Kaiouki was ranked 9th on the Tohan charts. The thirty-seventh volume was ranked 10th. The thirty-eighth volume was ranked 9th. The thirty-ninth volume was ranked 10th. The fortieth volume was ranked 11th.

References

External links

Shōnen manga
Kendo